Kathleen Rachel Maxwell-Hyslop,  (née Clay, 27 March 1914 – 9 May 2011) was an English archaeologist and scholar of the Ancient Near East.

Early life
Kathleen Rachel Clay was born in London to Sir Charles Travis Clay, an antiquarian and librarian at the House of Lords Library, and Hon. Alice Violet Robson (1892–1972), daughter of William Robson, Baron Robson. She attended Downe House School in Newbury, and graduated from Sorbonne, where she read French.

In 1933, Clay joined Mortimer Wheeler's excavations at Verulamium and Maiden Castle, Dorset. She was inspired by Kathleen Kenyon to join the newly established Institute of Archaeology at the University of London in 1934, one of its first three students. She studied under Sidney Smith and received a postgraduate diploma in Western Asian archaeology.

In 1938, she married Aymer Robert Maxwell-Hyslop, a civil servant. They had three children.

Career
Maxwell-Hyslop was given a role as honorary demonstrator at the Institute of Archaeology's new permanent location near Regent's Park. She was also involved in archaeological digs with Winifred Lamb at Kusura, Turkey.

During the Second World War, she joined the ambulance corps.

In 1946, Maxwell-Hyslop became a staff member of the department of Western Asiatic archaeology at the Institute. Here she was initially an assistant to Max Mallowan, later becoming a lecturer. Mallowan encouraged her to investigate Near Eastern metalwork. Her archaeological research on metal artefacts from the ancient Near East resulted in two articles on western Asian swords and daggers, establishing a new typology for these matériel.

Maxwell-Hyslop also looked after the administration of Mallowan's excavations at Nimrud, where she was sent as part of her researches into the analysis of materials.

From 1962 to the late 1970s, she continued to teach, concentrating on the ancient metallurgy of the Near East. Her work encompassed a large geography – Egypt to Afghanistan, and long time periods – Bronze Age to Late Assyrian, and she published papers on their jewellery, metal working and technology. She also was interested in horticulture, writing a piece on the distribution of the sissoo tree across the Middle East.

In 1971, she published her authoritative survey of Western Asian jewellery and ornaments, again establishing a typology and demonstrating the links between articles found across the ancient Near East. As an attempt to synthesise the disparate material, it has not been superseded despite later discoveries at sites such as Nimrud, but only refined in its view of dating and distribution.

In 1972, Maxwell-Hyslop gave a lecture at the Fifth International Congress of Iranian Art and Archaeology, discussing how beads or granules of gold could be attached to rings and bracelets, noting that the art evidently originated from Queen Pu-Abi's tomb, dating to 3500 years b.p. in Ur.

Honours
Maxwell-Hyslop was elected a fellow of the Society of Antiquaries of London in 1943, and of the British Academy in 1991.

Later life
Between 1958 and 1996, Maxwell-Hyslop was on the council of the British School of Archaeology in Iraq, presiding it between 2004 and 2007. She died at the Horton Hospital in Banbury on 9 May 2011 and was buried at the church of St Michael and All Angels in Great Tew.

References

Sources

Publications

Biographical
 
 
 
 

Archaeologists from London
1914 births
2011 deaths
People from Chelsea, London
People associated with the UCL Institute of Archaeology
Fellows of the Society of Antiquaries of London
People educated at Downe House School
Fellows of the British Academy
British women archaeologists
British women historians